The McLean Stevenson Show is an American sitcom that aired on NBC on Wednesday nights from December 1, 1976, to March 23, 1977.

Premise
The series centered on Mac Ferguson, the owner of a hardware store in Evanston, Illinois (McLean Stevenson's birth state). Mac lived with his wife Peggy and two grown children, divorced daughter Janet, and son Chris. Also living in the household were Janet's two children, David and Jason, and Mac's mother-in-law.

Cast
McLean Stevenson as Mac Ferguson
Barbara Stuart as Peggy Ferguson
Madge West as Grandma Ferguson
Ayn Ruymen as Janet Ferguson
Andrew Parks as Chris Ferguson (eps 1–4)
Steve Nevil as Chris Ferguson (eps 5–12)
David Hollander as David
Jason Whitney as Jason

Background and production 
McLean Stevenson left M*A*S*H in March 1975. He was signed to a one-year contract by NBC after doing so. A variety show he hosted in November of that year was not successful. Stevenson was approached in the spring of 1976 with an idea for a sitcom. Mac Ferguson, a hardware store owner, was framed as a nice guy, assailed on all sides, a man caught in the middle, and a chronic victim of circumstances – similar to the character he played as Lt. Col. Henry Blake in M*A*S*H.

The first seven episodes were taped, with the cast and production staff expecting the series to begin airing in January 1977. Then, some of the NBC program executives changed out, and it was insisted that one of the primary actors be replaced. Shortly after this, the premiere date was moved up from January to December 1.

As Stevenson explained, "They scrapped the first seven episodes and started from scratch...We've been working morning noon and night ever since. The minute we finish a show it's on the air. We're running as fast as we can. Nobody knows when or if we'll ever catch up."

The series was cancelled for the first time in mid-January 1977, and it was announced it would be replaced on February 9. As Barbara Stuart explained, while a swan song party was underway for the cast and crew, word came through that The McLean Stevenson Show had instead been spared. "You would have expected us to start jumping up and down with excitement, but we all just sat there – probably because we'd all been through so much, we just couldn't get emotional about it any more."

Theme music 
The theme music was composed and performed by Paul Williams.

Episodes
Sources disagree on how many episodes were aired after the first ten; however, numerous contemporary newspaper sources suggest that the last two episodes of the series were aired on March 9, and March 23, respectively.

Reception
It was hoped that Stevenson's popularity on M*A*S*H would draw viewers in, but the actor's first starring vehicle failed to find an audience and was cancelled after three months.

References

External links
 

1976 American television series debuts
1977 American television series endings
1970s American sitcoms
English-language television shows
NBC original programming
Television series about families
Television shows set in Illinois